Mautby is a village and civil parish in the English county of Norfolk, in the East Flegg Hundred. The parish comprises a largely rural area along the north bank of the River Bure, and also includes the small villages of Runham and Thrigby.

For the purposes of local government, the parish falls within the district of Great Yarmouth.

The parish churches of Mautby and Runham are both dedicated to St Peter and St Paul; Thrigby's dedication is to St Mary. All three churches are Grade II* listed.

Notes

External links

SS Peter and Paul's on the European Round Tower Churches website
 for Mautby.
 for Runham.
 for Thrigby.
Information from Genuki Norfolk on Mautby.
Information from Genuki Norfolk on Runham.
Information from Genuki Norfolk on Thrigby.
Runham village web site

Villages in Norfolk
Civil parishes in Norfolk
Borough of Great Yarmouth